Clypeola is a genus of sea snails, marine gastropod mollusks in the family Calyptraeidae, the slipper snails, Chinese hat snails and cup-and-saucer snails.

This genus is considered a synonym of Sigapatella Lesson, 1831

Species
Species within the genus Clypeola include:
 Clypeola hedleyi (Smith, 1915): synonym of Sigapatella hedleyi (Smith, 1915) 
 Clypeola tenuis Gray 1867 - New Zealand : synonym of Sigapatella tenuis (Gray, 1867)

References

External links

Calyptraeidae
Taxa named by John Edward Gray